Places in Peril is a program during National Historic Preservation Month program that identifies and raises awareness for important places whose futures are in danger. Among those states who have their own program are:

 Alabama
 Durham, North Carolina 
 Georgia  
 South Dakota